The six-spot burnet (Zygaena filipendulae) is a day-flying moth of the family Zygaenidae.

Subspecies

Z. f. altapyrenaica Le Charles, 1950
Z. f. arctica Schneider, 1880
Z. f. balcanirosea Holik, 1943
Z. f. campaniae Rebel, 1901
Z. f. duponcheli Verity, 1921
Z. f. filipendulae
Z. f. gemella Marten, 1956
Z. f. gemina Burgeff, 1914
Z. f. gigantea Rocci, 1913
Z. f. himmighofeni Burgeff, 1926
Z. f. liguris Rocci, 1925
Z. f. maior Esper, 1794
Z. f. mannii Herrich-Schaffer, 1852 
Z. f. noacki Reiss, 1962
Z. f. oberthueriana Burgeff, 1926
Z. f. polygalae (Esper, 1783)
Z. f. praeochsenheimeri Verity, 1939
Z. f. pulcherrima Verity, 1921
Z. f. pulcherrimastoechadis Verity, 1921
Z. f. pyrenes Verity, 1921
Z. f. seeboldi Oberthur, 1910
Z. f. siciliensis Verity, 1917
Z. f. stephensi Dupont, 1900
Z. f. stoechadis (Borkhausen, 1793)
Z. f. zarana Burgeff, 1926

Distribution
Zygaena filipendulae is a common species throughout Europe , except the Atlantic coast of the Iberian Peninsula, northern Scandinavia and the Great Russian North. It is also present in Asia Minor, through the Caucasus to Syria and Lebanon.

Habitat
This species can be found in meadows, woodland clearings, sea-cliffs and area rich in grasses and flowers, up to 2,000 m altitude.

Description
The sexes are similar. The fore wings are dark metallic green with six vivid red spots (sometimes the spots are merged causing possible confusion with other species such as the five-spot burnet). Occasionally, the spots are yellow or even black. The hind wings are red with a blackish fringe. The larva is plump and hairy with variable markings, usually pale green with rows of black spots.

It is an aposematic moth because it is distinguished by its colors as toxic to predators like birds and lizards. If attacked it emits a liquid containing cyanide.

Biology
The adults fly on hot, sunny days from June to August, and are attracted to a wide variety of flowers such as knapweed and scabious, as well as the larval food plants bird's foot trefoil, Dorycnium, Coronilla and clover.

The species overwinters as a larva. The larva pupates in early summer in a papery cocoon attached to a grass stem.

Lifecycle

Bibliography
C. M. Naumann, G. M. Tarmann, W. G. Tremewan: The Western Palaearctic Zygaenidae. Apollo Books, Stenstrup, 1999, 
Capinera, J. L. (Ed.), Encyclopedia of Entomology, 4 voll., 2nd Ed., Dordrecht, Springer Science+Business Media B.V., 2008, pp. lxiii + 4346, 
Chinery, Michael. Collins Guide to the Insects of Britain and Western Europe 1986. (reprinted 1991).
Kükenthal, W. (Ed.), Handbuch der Zoologie / Handbook of Zoology, Band 4: Arthropoda - 2.
Scoble, M. J., The Lepidoptera: Form, Function and Diversity, seconda edizione, London, Oxford University Press & Natural History Museum, 2011 [1992], pp. xi, 404, 
Skinner, Bernard.Colour Identification Guide to Moths of the British Isles 1984.
Stehr, F. W. (Ed.), Immature Insects, 2 volumi, seconda edizione, Dubuque, Iowa, Kendall/Hunt Pub. Co., 1991 [1987], pp. ix, 754,

Notes

References

External links
 Funet Taxonomy
 Lepiforum.de
 Lepinet.fr

Zygaena
Moths described in 1758
Moths of Europe
Moths of Asia
Taxa named by Carl Linnaeus
Zygaenoidea